MFederal Highway 115D is a toll highway primarily located in the State of Mexico. It serves as a bypass of the cities of Amecameca and Nepantla in the State of Mexico for traffic traveling Mexican Federal Highway 115. The road is operated by Caminos y Puentes Federales, which charges cars 42 pesos to travel Highway 115D.

The road's southern terminus, south of Nepantla, is in the municipality of Atlatlahucan, Morelos.

References 

Mexican Federal Highways